KALH-LP (95.1 FM, "Variety 95.1 FM") is a low-power FM radio station broadcasting a variety format. Licensed to Alamogordo, New Mexico, United States, the station is currently owned by Southwestern Trails Cultural Heritage Association.

History
The Federal Communications Commission issued a construction permit for the station on August 24, 2004. The station was assigned the KALH-LP call sign on September 14, 2004, and was granted its license to cover on January 6, 2006. KALH was named Country Station of the Year (2012) by New Music Weekly Magazine (Nashville).  

KALH Radio was founded in 2004 by Ken Bass. His mission to provide the community with the news they needed to know. He passed on March 27th, 2021. His family controlled the board of directors of the nonprofit holding company until December 27, 2022. A new board of directors took control of the nonprofit with a focus on expanding community outreach, having student involvement, main street business involvement of Alamogordo's New York Avenue and Tularosa's Granada Avenue Cultural Arts Districts with a greater a focus on arts, culture and community heritage. 

The station leadership transitioned on January 27, 2022, to a new board of directors and new management. Local news was rebranded from Spectrum news to the Alamogordo Town News radio edition sponsored by AlamogordoTownNews.com. The station is being relocated to Alamogordo's historic New York Avenue with plans for it to eventually be housed in the renovated 1920's era Sands Theater. 

The station is now managed by 2nd Life Media. Radio personality Anthony Lucero is the primary radio personality, and the operations is under the director of General Manager Chris Edwards of 2nd Life Media. The station remains a nonprofit community station with a focus on community affairs, student education and historic preservation.

References

External links

 

ALH-LP
Radio stations established in 2006
ALH-LP